The  Miss Arizona Teen USA competition is the pageant that selects the representative for the state of Arizona in the Miss Teen USA pageant and the title held by that winner.

The first Arizona Teen to place at Miss Teen USA was Jeri-Lynn Beatty who made the top 12 in 1990.  Three more Arizona teens have gone on to win the Miss Arizona USA title, including Danielle Demski, one of only two to place in the top five or six at Miss Teen USA.  Demski later built a career as a television presenter.

The current Miss Arizona Teen USA is MayaDenise Gaskin of Phoenix and was crowned in Gilbert on May 30, 2022. Gaskin will represent Arizona at Miss Teen USA 2022.

Miss Teen USA Placement Summary

Placements
Top 5/6: Courtney Hamilton (1996), Danielle Demski (1999)
Top 10/12: Jeri-Lynn Beatty (1990), Emerald Zellers (2006)
Top 15/16: Ashley Stainton (2008), Savannah Wix (2014), Neda Danilovic (2015), Karly Riggs (2017), Molly Schwanz (2020), MayaDenise Gaskin (2022)
Arizona holds a record of 10 placements at Miss Teen USA.

Awards
Best State Costume: Julie Hodges (1987)
Miss Photogenic: Kristi Vanney (1986)

Winners 

1 Age at the time of the Miss Teen USA pageant

References

External links
Official website

Arizona
Women in Arizona